Martin Alexander Aiono (born February 16, 1996) is an American singer, record producer, and actor from Phoenix, Arizona. Aiono is known for his videos on YouTube, which have amassed over 1 billion views, and his social media presence with upwards of six million followers. He released his first single on a major label with Interscope Records, "Work the Middle", in February 2017. He released his second single "Question" in April 2017. His third single, "Does It Feel Like Falling" was released on September 18, 2017. Aiono stars in  Netflix film Finding 'Ohana. Aiono released his first album, The Gospel at 23, on July 24, 2020.

YouTube
Aiono first created his own "flipped" versions of popular songs, including “Solamente Tú” and his "One Dance" mash-up which has gone on to have more than 67 million views. As of 2021, he has over six million YouTube subscribers and more than 1 billion views on his YouTube videos.

Music career
Aiono released his debut single "Doesn't Get Better" on March 15, 2013. Later that year, on May 23, Aiono released his debut EP Young & Foolish. The EP's title track was co-written with John Legend. Aiono has cited John Legend as one of his biggest influences and has written two songs with the singer.

In 2016, Aiono began creating "flipped" versions of popular songs, including a mashup of Drake's "One Dance" and Nicky Jam’s "Hasta el Amanecer" that received more than 67 million views on YouTube. The video showcased Aiono's vocals, charisma, guitar skills and production ability. Back in October 2016, Aiono recorded and produced a sing-off with singer and songwriter Conor Maynard which was released on Conor's YouTuber Channel and now in November 2017 has over 88 million views.

Aiono signed with Interscope Records, a division of Universal Music Group in early 2017. On January 27, 2017, Aiono released his single "Work the Middle". The song was produced by Axident and Dernst "D'Mile" Emile II. Aiono also contributed a cover of "Man in the Mirror" to The Lego Batman Movie in 2017.| As of 2019, Aiono is signed to Become Records.

In 2020, Aiono released his first album The Gospel at 23, as well as the documentary "The Making of The Gospel at 23 | Short Documentary". Aiono also released an EP, "Covered (Volume 2)", as well as the singles "The Medicine", "2 Kids", "Filling Shoes", "I Miss You", and "Another Life".

Acting career 
In September 2019, Netflix announced that Aiono would star in the 2021 film Finding 'Ohana.

In September 2021, Aiono stars as recurring role in the Disney+ show, Doogie Kameāloha, M.D.

Film

Series

Personal life
Aiono and his family, originally from Phoenix, Arizona, moved to Los Angeles, California so he could pursue a music career at 14 years old. They lived in a one bedroom apartment while he was making his first music connections by performing on the Santa Monica promenade where he met one of his managers. His mother is European American and his father is of Samoan and Māori (Ngāti Porou) descent and grew up in Tolaga Bay, New Zealand before moving to the United States. Aiono is a member of the Church of Jesus Christ of Latter-day Saints.

Discography

Albums

Extended plays

Singles

As main artist

As featured artist

Promotional singles

Tours
Headlining
 The After Party Tour (2017)
 Feels Like Tour (2018)
 Fun23 Tour (2019)

Co-headlining
 The Changes Tour (with William Singe) (2017)

Opening act
Bridgit Mendler – Summer Tour (2014)
The Dolan Twins - 4 Only U-Tour (2016)
Sabrina Carpenter - The De-Tour (2017)

References

External links

Living people
Musicians from Phoenix, Arizona
American producers
American male musicians
American people of Samoan descent
American people of New Zealand descent
American people of Māori descent
Latter Day Saints from Arizona
1996 births
Ngāti Porou people
YouTubers from Utah
YouTubers from Arizona